Philadelphia basement kidnapping, also known as the Basement of Horrors, describes the discovery of four people, being held against their will, in conditions of deprivation on October 17, 2011, in the basement of an apartment building in the Tacony neighborhood of Northeast Philadelphia, Pennsylvania.

The owner of the building discovered the captives' presence after investigating suspicious activity in the basement area. Three people were arrested as initial suspects in the case: Linda Weston, Gregory Thomas and Eddie Wright. A fourth person, Jean McIntosh, the daughter of Weston, was arrested on October 19. Ten people, including six children, were taken into custody on October 18 in connection with the discovery. A niece of Weston's, Beatrice Weston (19), was among them, and was found to be malnourished and suffering from multiple wounds. She had been reported missing in 2009. A Police investigator stated he had never seen such signs of abuse on a living person.

An investigation by the FBI and the Philadelphia Police Department is currently underway to determine if the suspects were part of a larger multi-state kidnapping scheme, as identifying papers of at least 50 other people were found in the initial search. Evidence so far suggests that people had been held for collection of their Social Security Disability benefits, as the four people initially found were mentally disabled.

Principal defendant history
Weston had previously been sentenced to eight years in prison for starving a man to death after he refused to support Weston's sister's unborn child. She served four years of her sentence. She had been given a diagnosis of schizophrenia at the time. Records show a person living with Weston in 2008 died that year, from what was at the time listed as natural causes. The person's family has asked that her death be reexamined. As of December 2011, more charges had been filed in the case against Weston, involving events dating to 2002.

Aftermath
The kidnapping received national and international attention, and raised awareness of the issue of the potential abuse of mentally disabled people for their benefits through the representative payee process.

In January 2013, the four original defendants, and a fifth, Nicklaus Woodard, of West Palm Beach, Florida,  were charged by a federal grand jury with a total of 196 criminal counts, including hate crime charges. All five were charged with four counts of a hate crime, conspiracy, racketeering, and kidnapping. Weston, Mcintosh, and Thomas were charged with involuntary servitude. Weston was charged with two counts of murder, with confinement and abuse allegedly causing the deaths of two victims. She was sentenced in September 2015 to life plus 80 years, admitting to all 196 federal counts against her, including murder, kidnapping, sex trafficking, hate crimes, forced labor, and benefits fraud.

Jean McIntosh pleaded guilty in December 2014 to charges including conspiracy to commit racketeering, hate crimes against disabled people, and kidnapping resulting in death.

References

See also
Adult Protective Services
Disability fraud

American kidnappers
Crimes in Philadelphia
October 2011 crimes in the United States
Disability in law
2011 in Pennsylvania